Ozeryane is a rural locality (a selo) in Ozeryansky Selsoviet of Belogorsky District, Amur Oblast, Russia. The population was 105 as of 2018. There is 1 street.

Geography 
Ozeryane is located on the right bank of the Belaya River, 55 km southeast of Belogorsk (the district's administrative centre) by road. Zarechnoye is the nearest rural locality.

References 

Rural localities in Belogorsky District